Golf: Tee It Up! is a downloadable arcade-style golf title, developed by Housemarque and published by Activision for the Xbox 360. The title was released on July 9, 2008.  The title has two courses with a third that can be added as downloadable content. The title is an arcade game that has simple mechanics designed for approachable, fun, and short games.

Gameplay
Golf: Tee It Up! has simple game mechanics designed for approachability. The two joysticks allow for aiming while the distance the ball is hit and accuracy are controlled by three presses of a single button. The other major control mechanic is called focus. This allows you to boost your maximum distance or even alter the flight of the ball mid-flight to hit that perfect spot.

Players can play online with Xbox Live. The game is relatively short with only three total playable courses. Two 18-hole courses are included with Golf: Tee It Up!, Caribbean and Parkland. Caribbean is the easier of the two and based on any number of tropical resorts. Parkland is very loosely based on St Andrews Links including stone ruins and obstacles. On September 3, 2008, an expansion course, Desert Course, became available on Xbox Live as downloadable content.

Reception

The game received "average" reviews according to the review aggregation website Metacritic. Most critics praised its fun and good looks for an arcade game but wanted a longer game and disliked the sometimes quirky ball physics.

References

External links
 

2008 video games
Activision games
Golf video games
Video games developed in Finland
Video games scored by Jonne Valtonen
Xbox 360 Live Arcade games
Xbox 360-only games
Xbox 360 games
Housemarque games
Multiplayer and single-player video games